This is a list of seasons played by Coventry City in English and European football, from 1895 to the present day. It details the club's achievements in major competitions, and the top scorers for each season.

Seasons

Competition summaries
Pld = Matches played
W = Matches won
D = Matches drawn
L = Matches lost
GF = Goals for
GA = Goals against
Pts = Points
Pos = Final position

Seasons at each level
Information correct up to and including the 2022–23 season.

Top goalscorers

Most assists

Most appearances

Most clean sheets

Footnotes
A. The League Cup competition did not start until the 1960–61 season.
B. No competitive football was played between 1915 and 1919 due to the First World War.
C. No competitive football was played between 1939 and 1945 due to the Second World War.
D. The FA Cup was contested in 1945–46 but the Football League did not resume until the following season.
E. Highest League finish.
F. Deducted 10 points by the Football League.
G. Promoted via the play-offs, and so player statistics include an additional 3 league games.  Also lowest League finish.
H. The season was postponed on 13 March 2020 after 34 league games, and later concluded prematurely due to the COVID-19 pandemic, with league positions and promotions decided on a points-per-game basis.
I. Includes goals scored in all competitive competitions including cup games, but excludes the Birmingham Senior Cup, the Full Members' Cup and the Texaco Cup.
J. Includes assists in all competitive competitions including cup games, but excludes the Birmingham Senior Cup, the Full Members' Cup and the Texaco Cup.
K. Includes appearances in all competitive competitions including cup games, but excludes the Birmingham Senior Cup, the Full Members' Cup and the Texaco Cup.
L. Includes clean sheets in all competitive competitions including cup games, but excludes the Birmingham Senior Cup, the Full Members' Cup and the Texaco Cup.

See also
List of Coventry City F.C. records and statistics
Coventry City F.C. Player of the Year
Coventry City F.C. in European football

References

External links

Seasons
 
Coventry City